Manresa House is a retreat centre run by the Society of Jesus in the Dollymount area of Clontarf in Dublin, near Saint Anne's Park. In the 19th century it was home to Robert Warren and Arthur Guinness, and it is a protected structure.

History

Origins
Manresa House is a stately home that has had a series of different owners. It was originally known as Granby Hill, and then Baymount Castle and included 17 acres of land surrounding the house. Until 1783, it was a residence of the Bishop of Down and Connor, James Traill. In 1838, it was renovated by Robert Warren. Soon after, it became the property of the Sisters of Loreto who used it as a school. In 1851, it was renovated by the sisters, because the building was damaged by a serious fire that year.

In 1898, they sold it to Arthur Guinness, 1st Baron Ardilaun and moved to Balbriggan.

Use as a Preparatory School
In around 1904 William Scott opened a school on the premises called Baymount Preparatory School, of which he was headmaster until 1936. The school was then acquired by John Tudor Gwynn, who ran it until 1948. John T Gwynn was a descendant of John Gwynn and a member of the Gwynn family that included noted literary figures such as Stephen Gwynn and Edward Gwynn.

Establishment of Spirituality Centre
In 1948, the Archbishop of Dublin, John Charles McQuaid asked the Jesuits to establish a spirituality centre in the Dollymount area, so they bought Baymount Castle. They renamed it Manresa House after Manresa in Catalonia, Spain, where St Ignatius of Loyola, the founder of the Jesuits had many spiritual experiences that contributed to formulation of his Spiritual Exercises.

The Retreat Centre
The first retreat was held there in 1949. In 1966, a new separate house to was built to accommodate more retreatants and was opened in 1967. In 1969, the Irish Jesuits moved their novitiate from Emo Court in County Laois to a building within the grounds of Manresa House. In 1977, part of the property, near the novitiate, was sold to developers to build a housing estate. In 1991, the novitiate moved to another part of Dublin. In 2006, a new building was built on the site of the old novitiate for the Tertianship of the Jesuits in Europe.

Interior
The centre offers a variety of directed retreats, seminars, and various day and evening events, as well as the 30-day retreat, from the Spiritual Exercises.

In the oval meditation room are a set of windows designed by Evie Hone. They were installed in the 1990s. The windows were originally in the former Jesuit school St Stanislaus College, Tullabeg, Co. Offaly.

Courses
Manresa House, runs a two year Diploma in Spirituality (Spiritual Direction) accredited by St Patrick's College, Maynooth, and has been offered in centres in Galway and Larne. Training in supervision for spiritual directors is also offered.

People associated with Manresa House
Joseph Dargan, Laurence Murphy, Paddy Carberry were among those who served as masters of novices in Manresa. The rôle of Rector has been occupied variously by Dónal Mulcahy, Kieran Hanley(1989-1993), Paul Andrews, Joe Dargan and Mike Drennan. The current rector is Willie Reynolds SJ.

See also
 Ignatian Spirituality
 List of Jesuit sites in Ireland

References

External links
 Manresa, Jesuit Centre of Spirituality site

Country houses in Ireland
Buildings and structures in Dublin (city)
Ignatian spirituality
Spiritual retreats